Cédric Pénicaud (born 27 September 1971 in Limoges) is a retired breaststroke swimmer from France, who represented his country at the 1988 Summer Olympics in Seoul, South Korea. He won a silver medal at the 1991 European Long Course Championships in Athens, Greece, as a member of the French relay team in the men's 4 × 100 m medley.

References
 

French male breaststroke swimmers
Swimmers at the 1988 Summer Olympics
Olympic swimmers of France
1971 births
Living people
Sportspeople from Limoges
Place of birth missing (living people)
European Aquatics Championships medalists in swimming
Mediterranean Games gold medalists for France
Swimmers at the 1991 Mediterranean Games
Swimmers at the 1993 Mediterranean Games
Mediterranean Games medalists in swimming